Buk-gu, Ulsan is a South Korea Parliamentary electorate.

Members of Parliament for Buk-gu, Ulsan

Election results

References

Constituencies of the National Assembly (South Korea)